Qualifying for the 2016 FIBA Asia Challenge is currently being held to determine the eight teams that will participate in the 2016 FIBA Asia Challenge, aside from the host team  and 2015 FIBA Asia Championship winners . Qualification is via FIBA Asia zone, with each zone having an automatic one berth, plus additional berths from the teams' zones of the second and third runners-up in the 2015 FIBA Asia Championship.

Central Asia

East Asia

Persian Gulf

South Asia 

The 2016 South Asian Basketball Championship in Bengaluru, India determined South Asia's lone qualifier.

Southeast Asia 

The 2016 Southeast Asian Basketball Association Cup in Bangkok, Thailand determined Southeast Asia's two qualifiers.

Hosts  and the  already clinched the SEABA spots due to their top two placings with one more round to go. The Philippines won their second tournament title by defeating the hosts Thailand in the championship match, 97−80.

West Asia 
The 2016 West Asian Basketball Association Championship in Amman, Jordan will determine West Asia's two qualifiers.  automatically qualified whether or not they win the tournament by virtue of being the host of the main tournament. Nevertheless, they still reigned over the sub-zone tournament by sweeping their opponents.

References 

Qual